Sageworks is a private financial information company headquartered in Raleigh, North Carolina. Founded in 1998, Sageworks provides financial analysis and risk management software, in addition to creating products for commercial lenders. It collects financial information on the private sector by aggregating data from large accounting firms. The company also publishes "private company indicator" reports, which analyze activity and profitability in certain market segments. The firm is a private business key executives include co-founder and chairman Brian Hamilton and CEO Scott Ogle.

History 
Sageworks was founded in Raleigh, North Carolina in 1998 by serial entrepreneur Brian Hamilton and computer programmer Sarah Tourville. The two met while Hamilton was teaching at Duke University Continuing Studies in the early 1990s. Tourville, one of Hamilton's students, said she could program a financial analysis system after Hamilton said that no one has come up with a way to automate certain analyses. In the late 1990s Hamilton and Tourville spent two years developing software for what was to be known as Sageworks' Financial Information into Narrative Data (FIND), the technology behind its ProfitCents product. Initially the firm struggled to properly market its tools in the early 2000s. CitiBank and Intuit were both early adopters.

Sageworks has collected financial data since financial statement year 2001. By 2014, it included 2001-2011 data from nearly 240,000 private firms, including three or more consecutive years of financial data for each of 99,040. It provides financial performance data on private companies based on their income statements and balance sheets. The data is provided by large accounting firms that work with private companies, then anonymized by labeling each company with a unique identifier number. Commercial users are given access to aggregated data by industry and region and not the financials of individual companies.  Its data tends to comprise figures from large private firms; as of 2014, it contained data on almost 240,000 private companies. This compares to Sageworks' multi-year data from 2001 to 2011 of 4,360 public U.S. firms.Commercial users are given access to aggregated data by industry and region and not the financials of individual companies.  Its data tends to comprise figures from large private firms; as of 2014, it contained data on almost 240,000 private companies.

In January 2004, the company announced a deal to license to LexisNexis its ProfitCents public product, which turns U.S. Securities and Exchange Commission data from public companies into plain-English text reports.

In 2013, Scott Ogle became chief executive officer.

In 2014, Sageworks launched its LoanSage product, a platform for small business owners to get loans of up to $2 million in one day. That same year, the company unveiled Sageworks Bank Information, a cloud-based platform providing data on banks and credit unions  with data of 6,000 U.S. banks and 7,000 credit unions. The same  year it launched its CFO platform, a suite of financial analysis tools for financial executives with financial analysis, benchmarking, valuation, and industry data, and Sageworks Bank Information, a cloud-based platform with bank and credit union data.

In November 2016, the company launched a platform that helps lenders provide financing for small and medium-sized businesses. In June 2017, it released its CashSage product, for analyzing cash flow.

Uses

Sageworks' data has been used by academics to analyze economics using data from private companies, where traditionally only a very small data-set of about 4,000 public companies that publicly reported their data was available. According to a paper from researchers with New York University and Harvard Business School, Sageworks' data is especially useful, because it is free of survivor bias and other selection biases.

Sageworks also uses data to create the "Sageworks Private Company Indicator", which shows private-company sales growth and profit margins. The firm also occasionally issues aggregate information about average profitability of private firms in various industries.

Acquisition 
In 2018, Accel-KKR acquired Sageworks for an undisclosed amount and became part of the Banker's Toolbox suite of products. In 2019, Banker's Toolbox sunset the Sageworks brand and re-branded themselves as Abrigo.

Inmates to Entrepreneurs
Sageworks and its co-founder, Hamilton, started a program called Inmates to Entrepreneurs in 2008. The program encourages prison inmates to start their own business. P  The program is based on Hamilton's small business seminar, focusing on marketing, sales, customer service, accounting, finance and staffing. Participants make informal business plans and are paired with mentors.

Notes

References

External links
 Sageworks Official Site

Companies based in Raleigh, North Carolina
Financial services companies established in 1998
Financial services companies of the United States